The Surplus Property Act of 1944 (ch. 479,  et seq., enacted October 3, 1944) is an act of the United States Congress that was enacted to provide for the disposal of surplus government property to "a State, political subdivision of a State, or tax-supported organization".  It authorized a three-member board, known as the Surplus Property Board, a structure that was replaced within a year by an agency run by a single administrator.  Many of its provisions were repealed on July 1, 1949.

See also 
 War Assets Administration
 Law Enforcement Support Office

References

Further reading 
 

United States federal government administration legislation